Jacques Morali (4 July 1947 – 15 November 1991) was a French disco and dance music record producer and songwriter, known for creating acts like The Ritchie Family and Village People.

Early life
Morali was born in Casablanca, Morocco. He may have had Jewish ancestry.

Career

Beginning in France
He made his start in the music business at the end of the 1960s, writing music for orchestras in Paris, for the Crazy Horse, for himself as a solo artist (he played in 1967 show "Elle aime, elle n'aime pas" and released a single of the same title) but also for performers like Peter Fersen. Viva Zapata (Venus VS-71451), one of his first French productions, was sung by "Clint Farwood" - a pseudonym for a member of King Harvest. In the early 1970s, he met French music producer Henri Belolo. But he thought quickly that his success in France was not as high as expected and started to try his luck in North America. Through meeting José Eber, Elizabeth Taylor and Cher's hairdresser, he became familiar with Philadelphia International Records. At the time, Morali proposed several projects to Belolo without convincing him.

International
In 1975, Morali told Belolo about his intention to adapt the Brazilian song "Brazil" from a musical starring Carmen Miranda. The idea was to make an epic record for the clubs, sung by larger-than-life female singers. Seduced by the idea, Belolo agreed to finance a long-lasting Morali residency at Sigma Sound Studios in Philadelphia. That was the start of their collaboration. They cast three girls (Cheryl Jacks, Cassandra Wooten and Gwendolyn Oliver) and named the band The Ritchie Family. "Brazil" was a solid success, the first of many that made them long-term partners ("The Best Disco In Town" (1976), "Life Is Music" (1977), "African Queens" (1977), "Quiet Village" (1977) & "American Generation" (1978)), both as creator and author, on top of also being writer and editor (Black Scorpio Publishing).

Mainstream
While in New York, Morali attended a costume ball at "Les Mouches", a gay disco in Greenwich Village. As he gazed around the room, he was impressed by all the "macho male stereotypes" portrayed by the party guests. The idea came to him to put together a group of singers and dancers, each one playing a different gay fantasy figure. At first, Belolo was not involved in this project, but when he saw that Morali had succeeded in signing a licensing deal with Casablanca Records (one of the more famous disco labels), Belolo decided to become his close sidekick on the project. The Village People's songs include "San Francisco (You've Got Me)" (1977), "YMCA" (1978), "Macho Man" (1978), "In the Navy" (1979), "Go West" (1980) and "Sex Over the Phone" (1985) and they became one of the more successful acts of the disco era with their flamboyant concept albums.

Jacques Morali's music was characterized by simple arrangements, a unique sense of camp, simplistic lyrics and simple catchy melodies that could be remembered easily. Between 1974 and 1982, he recorded over 65 albums. He co-wrote songs for many artists including Patrick Juvet, Régine, Dalida, Eric Russell, Cher, Patricia Norton, Julius Brown, Starlight, Diva, Dennis Parker, David London, Wayne Scott, Lova Moor and Pia Zadora. After the post-1970s disco backlash, he began collaborating with Fred Zarr, precipitating work with Break Machine and 1984's Eartha Kitt album I Love Men.

In the late 1970s, he had a sexual relationship with singer/actor/adult film star Wade Nichols/Dennis Parker.

Death
Morali contracted HIV in the mid-1980s. On 15 November 1991, he died of AIDS-related causes in Paris at the age of 44. Morali was buried in Saint-Paul-de-Vence.

References

External links
 

1947 births
1991 deaths
Gay singers
Gay songwriters
French expatriates in the United States
French LGBT singers
French LGBT songwriters
French gay musicians
Moroccan emigrants to France
French dance musicians
Village People
20th-century French male singers
AIDS-related deaths in France
20th-century LGBT people

https://www.discogs.com/artist/89428-Jacques-Morali